TV 2 Zebra is a Norwegian television channel showing entertainment programmes, interactive programmes and live sport mainly targeted towards a male audience. The channel was started as TV 2 Xtra on 24 January 2004, but before that the channel was first announced in 2003 as TV2 Plus, which is its working name. 
 
TV 2 Zebra has the rights to "Tippeligaen", and the channel broadcasts a live game every week. In addition, people can subscribe to the other games by buying TV 2 SPORT. TV 2 Zebra also invests in Norwegian handball series. TV 2 owns the rights to European and World Championships in handball.

Programs 
 List of programs broadcast by TV 2 Zebra

References 

TV 2 (Norway)
Television channels and stations established in 2004
2004 establishments in Norway
Television channels in Norway